Dhivagaran Santhosh (also known as Diwakar) is an Indian playback singer and live performer. He is best known for winning season 4 of Airtel Super Singer, a Tamil language musical reality TV show which was telecast from December 2012 to February 2014 on Vijay TV.

Career

Television works
Diwakar participated in various reality TV musical competitions telecast on various Tamil language TV channels, including Zee Tamil's Sa Re Ga Ma Pa 2009 Challenge, Jaya TV's Hariyudan Naan, and season 2 of Sun TV's Sangeetha Mahayuddham. In 2012, Diwakar was crowned runner up in Raj TV's Voice of Tamil Nadu.

On 1 February 2014, he was crowned the winner of season 4 of the Airtel Super Singer music competition telecast on Vijay TV, having received the greatest number of viewer votes. During the show's grand finale, Diwakar's performance of the song "Neeye Unakku Endrum" from the film Bale Pandiya prompted a standing ovation from the audience and a kiss on his forehead from playback singer, S. Janaki.

Playback singing and recordings
Diwakar recorded his first song as a playback singer for music director D. Imman for the movie 'Panchu Mittai'. However, his voice as a playback singer was first released in the Tamil language movie, Vadacurry, for a song co-sung by playback singers Vijay Prakash and Ajeesh.

Film songs

Albums

Filmography

Television

References

External links

1990 births
Living people
Indian male playback singers
Tamil playback singers
Singers from Chennai